

Events
The Mexican Mafia criminal group is created by Chicano gang members in the Deuel Vocational Institution in Tracy, California. 
March – Teamster's Union President Dave Beck is brought before the U.S. Senate Select Committee on Improper Activities in Labor and Management (McClellan Committee) where he is charged with misappropriation of union funds well as his ties to organized crime figures by Chief Counsel Robert F. Kennedy and is imprisoned later that year. Nathan Shefferman, a Chicago Teamsters Union official and longtime associate, is also called before the committee to testify on related charges.
March 11 – Frank Costello is released from federal custody as his case is reviewed by the United States Supreme Court.
May 2 – Frank Costello, surviving an assassination attempt, retires as the leader of the Luciano crime family as Vito Genovese assumes control.
June 17 – Frank Scalise, Anastasia Family underboss, is killed by Jimmy Squilante, on Anastasia's orders, after selling La Cosa Nostra memberships for $50,000 and screwing up a heroin deal. Anastasia lieutenant Carlo Gambino is named underboss.
July 25 – Johnny Dio is convicted of bribery and conspiracy as part of a labor racketeering case in New York City garment district and sentenced to two years in prison.
September 19 – Joseph Scalise is killed by James Squillante (Albert Anastasia's nephew) and disposed of by Squilante's garbage hauling interests after a welcome home party for threatening to avenge his brother, Frank Scalise's murder.
October 12–16 – Grand Hotel des Palmes Mafia meeting. American gangster Joseph Bonanno attends a series of meetings between some high-level Sicilian and American mafiosi in the Grand Hotel des Palmes (Albergo delle Palme) in Palermo, Sicily. The Sicilian Mafia decides to compose its first Sicilian Mafia Commission and elects Salvatore Greco as its first "secretary". According to some, one of the main topics on the agenda was the organisation of the heroin trade on an international basis. The FBI believed it was this meeting that established the Bonanno Crime Family in the heroin trade.
October 25 – Albert Anastasia is murdered in a New York barbershop on the orders of Vito Genovese and Lt. Carlo Gambino (the decision was supported by Tommy Lucchese, Meyer Lansky and Tampa Boss Santo Trafficante Jr.). The Genovese-Gambino-Lucchese alliance wanted to make Gambino  Boss of Anastasia's Family, the Lansky-Trafficante alliance was angered by Anastasia muscling into the Havana, Cuba casino rackets.
November 10 – A meeting is held in Livingston, New Jersey, possibly in connection to the Apalachin Conference.
November 14 – Over sixty organized crime figures including Vito Genovese, Carlo Gambino, Paul Castellano, Joseph Bonanno, Joseph Profaci, Joseph Magliocco and John Montana are arrested at the home of Joseph Barbara, Sr. during the Apalachin Conference. Following this incident, federal authorities are forced to admit the possibility of the existence of organized crime.

Arts and literature

Births

Deaths
David Berman, Las Vegas mobster
June 17 – Frank Scalise, New York mobster
September 19 – Joseph Scalise, brother of Frank Scalise
October 25 – Albert Anastasia "Lord High Executioner"/"The Mad Hatter", Gambino crime family boss

Notes

Organized crime
Years in organized crime